K273BH (102.5 FM, "Hot 102.5") is a translator broadcasting the mainstream urban format of the HD3 subcarrier of iHeartMedia's KTCZ-FM. Licensed to Fridley, Minnesota, it serves the Minneapolis-St. Paul metropolitan area inside the I-494/I-694 beltway. The station is currently owned by iHeartMedia, through licensee iHM Licenses, LLC. All the offices and studios are located in St. Louis Park and the transmitter is atop the IDS Center in downtown Minneapolis.

History
In 2010, the translator signed on carrying KDWB-FM's HD2 sub-channel, which aired a dance music format known as "The Party Zone." In 2013, this would be dropped for a relay of the Air 1 network, which is also carried on KTCZ-HD2. The relay would move to W225AP (92.9 FM) and K249ED (97.7 FM).

On June 5, 2015, at 3 p.m., after stunting for an hour with songs with the word "hot" in the name, KTCZ-HD3/K273BH launched with a classic hip hop format, branded as "Hot 102.5". The format would shift to urban on February 12, 2018, while retaining the "Hot" branding.

On August 7, 2019, iHeartMedia subsequently announced its intent to acquire the station outright, citing EMF's discomforts of allowing an urban contemporary format on stations the organization owns. This acquisition was part of a complex swap deal, which would see EMF buying K244FE. The deal was consummated on March 31, 2020.

References

External links
Hot 102.5

Radio stations in Minnesota
IHeartMedia radio stations
Mainstream urban radio stations in the United States
Radio stations established in 2010
2010 establishments in Minnesota